Brassavola flagellaris is a species of epiphytic orchid of the Cattleya alliance. It grows wild in eastern Brazil (from Minas Gerais to Paraná), where it fills the evening air with the citrus-like fragrance of its blossoms.

Etymology
The specific epithet, flagellaris, refers to the elongated (whip-like) leaves.

Description
Brassavola flagellaris is a sympodial epiphyte (sometimes a lithophyte) with terete pseudobulbs, 6–30 cm long, each carrying a single elongated succulent leaf. The erect or pendulous inflorescence carries one to several flowers bearing long and narrow light-green sepals which closely resemble the lateral petals. The broad white lip closely encircles most of the light yellow-green column.

Members of this species grow readily under cultivation and are resistant to drought. They can be placed on slabs to allow their roots sufficient aeration.

References

External links

flagellaris
Epiphytic orchids
Endemic orchids of Brazil
Plants described in 1882